The London Borough of Islington is short of large parks and open spaces, given its status in recent decades as a desirable place of residence. In fact, Islington has the lowest ratio of open space to built-up areas of any London borough. The largest continuous open space in the borough, at 11.75 hectares (29 acres), is Highbury Fields.

Islington has access to large open spaces in neighbouring London boroughs. The Islington district of Finsbury Park is next to the southern end of Finsbury Park, in Haringey. The "Green Route" of the Regent's Canal tow path provides access to Regent's Park to the west – in Camden; and Victoria Park to the east – in Tower Hamlets. Many other open spaces such as Clissold Park in Hackney are situated on the borders of the borough. Islington also contains many well-kept public squares and greens, such as Canonbury Square and Thornhill Square.

Because of the perceived open space deficit, many small community gardens grew up in Islington from the 1970s on. Created and maintained by local residents on sites made derelict by the Blitz and redevelopment, not all have survived, but one notable remaining example, open to the public, is Culpeper Community Garden, near the Angel.

List of open spaces 

 The Artillery Ground is an  open space on the edge of the City. It has belonged to the Honourable Artillery Company since 1638. While it is not normally open to the public, the ground contains many sports facilities that are used by local schools
 Barnard Park, 
 Bunhill Fields is a  burial ground, adjacent to the Artillery Ground. It contains many dissenter burials, including Daniel Defoe, John Bunyan and William Blake. It is administered by the Corporation of London. Part contains historic graves; but part is laid to a pleasant and quiet park.
 Caledonian Park,  - on the site of the former Caledonian Cattle Market once the biggest cattle market in North London
 Charterhouse Square, former burial ground converted into a garden square
 Claremont Square is a former reservoir that is closed to the public
 Compton Terrace Garden, 
 Crouch Hill Park is located about halfway along the Parkland Walk
 Duncan Terrace Gardens & Colebrook Row Gardens, 
 Elthorne Park, 
 Finsbury Square, 
 Fortune Street Park, 
 Freightliners City Farm is in Lower Holloway. This small urban farm contains a wide range of animals from rabbits to cows to chickens and pigs
 Highbury Fields, 
 Islington Green, 
 Jewish Burial Ground, 
 Joseph Grimaldi Park, 
 King Square Gardens, is a park in the St Luke's area
 Laycock Street Open Space, 
 Market Road Gardens, 
 New River Walk including Astey's Row Rock Gardens/Astey's Row Playground,  is a linear walk that connects the Angel and Canonbury along the banks of the New River
 Newington Green
 Paradise Park, 
 The Parkland Walk is a linear park along the route of a disused railway line from Finsbury Park to Highgate Woods, a small part of which is in Islington with the rest being in Haringey
 Petherton Green is a linear walk along the route of the New River, which was culverted and covered in 1868-70, and an avenue of trees and grass planted down the middle
 The Regent's Canal enters the Islington Tunnel, near City Road Lock. A linear walk is marked through the streets and parks above the tunnel
 Rosemary Gardens, 
 Spa Fields, 
 St Mary's Church Gardens (also known as Islington Parish Church), 
 St Mary Magdalene Gardens
 Thornhill Gardens (also known as Thornhill Road Gardens),  
 Tufnell Park Playing Fields, 
 Whittington Park, 
 Wray Crescent,

Garden squares
 Alwyne Square
 Andersons Square
 Arlington Square
 Arundel Square
 Barnsbury Square
 Bartholomew Square
 Canonbury Square
 Charterhouse Square
 Claremont Square
 Cloudesley Square
 Edward Square
 Finsbury Square
 Gibson Square
 Granville Square
 King Square
 Lloyd Square
 Lonsdale Square
 Milner Square
 Myddelton Square
 Northampton Square
 Percy Square
 Thornhill Square
 Tibberton Square
 Union Square, Islington
 Vernon Square
 Wilmington Square
 Wilton Square

Local Nature Reserves
There are three Local Nature Reserves in Islington, Gillespie Park, Barnsbury Wood, and the part of the Parkland Walk which is in the borough.

See also
Copenhagen House Grounds

References

External links
 Islington Council list
 Parks and Gardens list
 Culpeper Community Garden
 Caledonian Park
 Freightliners farm

Parks and open spaces in the London Borough of Islington
Squares in the London Borough of Islington